The Clarion Golden Eagles are the athletic teams that represent Pennsylvania Western University Clarion (known before July 2022 as Clarion University of Pennsylvania), located in Clarion, Pennsylvania, in NCAA Division II intercollegiate sports. The Golden Eagles are members of the Pennsylvania State Athletic Conference (PSAC) for 13 of 14 varsity sports; the wrestling team competes in the Mid-American Conference (MAC) as a member of the NCAA's Division I. The Golden Eagles have been a member of the PSAC since its foundation in 1951.

History
Notable former Golden Eagles include Kurt Angle NCAA Division I Wrestling Champion and Olympic Wrestler; former UFC Champion Frankie Edgar who was a four-time NCAA Division I tournament qualifier; Reggie Wells, NFL offensive lineman; Cy Young winner Pete Vukovich; and Men's NCAA Division I Basketball Champion Coach at Kentucky John Calipari, a point guard for Clarion University from 1980-1982.

Conferences
1908–1950: Independent
1951–present: Pennsylvania State Athletic Conference

Varsity teams

List of teams

Men's sports (6)
Baseball
Basketball
Football
Golf
Swimming and diving
Wrestling

Women's sports (8)
Basketball
Cross country
Golf
Soccer
Softball
Swimming and diving
Tennis
Track and field
Volleyball

National championships

Team

Individual sports

Football
Clarion has made one appearance in the NCAA Division II football playoffs; their record is 2–1.

The team defeated the East Carolina Pirates in the 1952 Lions Bowl, 13–6.

Wrestling

Men's Basketball

References

External links